Duguay-Trouin was a late 100-gun Hercule-class ship of the line of the French Navy, transformed into a Sail and Steam ship.

Service history
Started in 1827 as a 100-gun sailing ship, Duguay-Trouin, still unfinished, was transformed on keel from 1856. In 1860 she sailed to New Caledonia and became the first steam ship to cross Cape Horn.

From 1863, she was decommissioned and served as hospital from 1867 before becoming a prison hulk for prisoners of the Paris Commune. She was renamed Vétéran in the 1870s, and was broken up around 1877.

Notes, citations, and references

Notes

Citations

References

 100-guns ships of the line

Ships of the line of the French Navy
1854 ships
Hercule-class ships of the line
Victorian-era ships of the line